Styrrup with Oldcotes is a civil parish in the Bassetlaw district, within the county of Nottinghamshire, England.
The overall area had a population of 684 at the 2011 census. The parish lies in the north of the county. It is 138 miles north west of London, 31 miles north of the city of Nottingham, and 15 miles east of the city of Sheffield. The parish rests alongside the county border with South Yorkshire.

Toponymy 
Styrrup is mentioned in the Domesday Book in 1086 as Estirape, the name having some topographical meaning (perhaps regarding the shape of a nearby hill). Oldcotes derives from 'owl-cottages', having changed through forms such as Ullcoats and Oldcoates to its present spelling. The parish was singularly called Styrrup until 1951.

Geography

Location 
The parish lies along the north west boundary of the Nottinghamshire and South Yorkshire border.

It is surrounded by the following local areas:

 Tickhill, Harworth and Bircotes to the north
 Langold, Hodsock and Blyth to the south
 Ranskill and Scrooby to the east
 Firbeck and Maltby to the west.

Settlements 
The parish consists of two settlements:

 Oldcotes
 Styrrup

Oldcotes 

It is focused around the A634 Maltby to Blyth road, and the A60.

Styrrup 

Styrrup is based in the north of the parish, lying just to the left of the A1(M) trunk road. It is a linear settlement, clustered mainly around Main Street on the B6463 road.

Landscape 
Predominantly, many of the parish residents are clustered around the villages. Outside of these is a scattering of farms, farmhouses and cottages amongst a wider rural setting.

Several small wooded areas exist mainly to the centre and east of the parish.

Water features 

 River Ryton forms the east boundary of the parish
 River Torne is to the north west along the county border
 Oldcotes Dyke is the south border of the parish. It is a tributary of the Ryton, but branches from it in the adjacent Blyth parish.

Land elevation 
The parish is relatively low-lying.

Governance 
Although discrete settlements, these are managed at the first level of public administration as Styrrup with Oldcotes Parish Council.

At district level, the wider area is managed by Bassetlaw District Council, and by Nottinghamshire County Council at its highest tier.

History 

Much of the area was owned by the Duchy of Lancaster. A notable Lord of the manor by the middle 1800s was Viscount Galway of nearby Serlby Hall, with holdings around Styrrup. There was once an association with Styrrup and Oldcotes as townships under the parishes of Blyth and Harworth. The common land was enclosed in 1802.  Edward Chaloner, a Liverpool timber businessman built a number of buildings in Oldcotes including the Catholic church in the mid 19th century. The Wesleyan chapel was erected in 1840. Oldcotes had an extensive brewery in the mid 1800s formed by the Smith and Nephew business. The East Lodge was built in 1855 and is associated to the nearby Hermeston Hall, of the east edge of Oldcotes village. A number of water mills were established in the area around Oldcotes Dyke about this time. In earlier times a lake called White Water existed and was the only natural lake in the county, it had since been drained in the 1800s by William Mellish and turned into farmland. The A1(M) Doncaster bypass in the area opened in 1961. The area was surrounded by collieries; Firbeck and Harworth were linked by railway branches from what is now the freight-only South Yorkshire Joint Railway, the lines going through the west and north of the parish, with the mines closing in 1968 and 2006 respectively.

Economy 
The Brunel Park Industrial Estate is in the north of the parish, east of Styrrup.

There is a public house in Oldcotes, The King William IV.

A Sunday market and car boot site lies alongside the A634 road in the south of the parish.

Styrrup Hall is a modern golf and country club and was established in 2000 on former agricultural land. The nearby former Styrrup Hall is a farm and private residence.

Religious sites 
There are two churches, both in Oldcotes village:

 Church of St. Mark, which is a Church of England parish church;
 St. Helen's Rectory, which is Roman Catholic.

There is a Wesleyan chapel building in Oldcotes which has been deconsecrated and is now a private dwelling.

Landmarks

Protected areas 

There is a conservation area defined for Oldcotes.

Listed buildings and locations 
Over 20 buildings and residences throughout the parish are listed as features of historical interest primarily in Oldcotes with two in Styrrup, including:

A Grade II* arch associated with Serlby Hall

A World War I memorial in Oldcotes

The Oldcotes churches, including the deconsecrated Wesleyan chapel

An ancient Roman villa site in Oldcotes is registered as a scheduled monument.

Transport 
The A1(M) trunk route runs through the parish.

The A60, A614, A634 and B6463 are other key routes in the area.

References 
 

Civil parishes in Nottinghamshire
Bassetlaw District